Stănișești is a commune in Bacău County, Western Moldavia, Romania. It is composed of nine villages: Balotești, Belciuneasa, Benești, Crăiești, Gorghești, Slobozia, Slobozia Nouă, Stănișești and Văleni.

References

Communes in Bacău County
Localities in Western Moldavia